Viola cheiranthifolia is a species of the genus Viola. It is also known as the Teide violet and Teide daisy.

This plant is exclusively found in the dry and stony caldera of the volcano Teide on the Canary Island of Tenerife. It survives there in altitudes of 2000-3000m. Most of the time it is hiding under the rocks. It is only visible for three weeks in spring, when it comes out to the surface for pollination.

It reaches heights of 6 to 7 inches. The violet of the Teide is the plant that blooms to greater height of all Spain, can even be observed in the own crater of the Teide.

References 

Endemic flora of the Canary Islands
cheiranthifolia
Taxa named by Aimé Bonpland
Taxa named by Alexander von Humboldt